David W. Wolfe (born October 11, 1942) is an American Republican Party politician, who served in the New Jersey General Assembly from 1992 until 2020 where he represented the 10th Legislative District. Wolfe was the longest serving member of the Assembly.

Early life
Wolfe served on the Brick Township Council from 1976 to 1991 and was its Council President from 1987 to 1988 and from 1980 to 1981. Wolfe serves as a member of the advisory board of the Garden State Rehabilitation Center. He earned the rank of Eagle Scout in 1956, and has been a longtime supporter of scouting, receiving the Good Scout Award from the Boy Scouts of America in 1988. Wolfe received a B.A. in 1964 from Westminster College in History and was awarded an M.Ed. in 1966 from the University of Delaware. He is a professor at Ocean County College. He was born in Williamsport, Pennsylvania, and is a resident of Brick Township.

New Jersey Assembly
Wolfe served as Assistant Majority Leader from 1996 to 1998. He then served as Assistant Minority Leader from 2002 to 2008, when he was made Deputy Minority Leader. Wolfe announced on January 23, 2019 he wouldn't seek re-election in 2019.

Committees 
Education
Environment and Solid Waste
Joint Committee on the Public Schools

Electoral history

Assembly

References

External links
Assemblyman Wolfe's legislative web page, New Jersey Legislature
New Jersey Legislature financial disclosure forms
2015 2014 2013 2012 2011 2010 2009 2008 2007 2006 2005 2004
Official 10th Legislative District website
Assembly Member David W. Wolfe, Project Vote Smart
New Jersey Voter Information Website for 2003

1942 births
Living people
Republican Party members of the New Jersey General Assembly
New Jersey city council members
Politicians from Ocean County, New Jersey
Politicians from Williamsport, Pennsylvania
People from Brick Township, New Jersey
University of Delaware alumni
Westminster College (Pennsylvania) alumni
21st-century American politicians
20th-century American politicians